Afro-Soul/Drum Orgy is an album by American jazz composer and arranger A. K. Salim featuring Johnny Coles, Pat Patrick and Yusef Lateef recorded in 1964 for the Prestige label.

Reception

Allmusic awarded the album 3 stars

Track listing
All compositions by A. K. Salim.

 "Afrika (Africa)" – 9:40
 "Ngomba Ya Tempo (Elephant Dance)" – 9:40
 "Kumuamkia Mzulu (Salute to a Zulu)" – 7:00
 "Pepo Za Sarari (Trade Winds)" – 8:00

Personnel 
A. K. Salim – arranger, director
Johnny Coles – trumpet
Pat Patrick – alto saxophone, baritone saxophone, flute
Yusef Lateef – tenor saxophone, flute, argol
Philemon Hon – African xylophone, tambor drums
Juan Cadaviejo – congas
Osvaldo "Chihuahua" Martinez – bongos, congas, cowbells
William Correa – timbales

References 

1965 albums
A. K. Salim albums
Prestige Records albums
Albums recorded at Van Gelder Studio